"Don't Make a Fool of Yourself" is a song by American recording artist Stacey Q. It was taken from her second studio album, Hard Machine (1988). The song was written by Stacey Swain, Jon St. James and Skip Hahn and was produced by Jon St. James. The song was mixed by musician Shep Pettibone, who collaborated with artists like Madonna, Pet Shop Boys, Janet Jackson and others. It was released as the album's first single on March 25, 1988 by Atlantic Records. The song peaked at #66 on the Billboard Hot 100 and #4 on the Billboard Dance charts.

Composition 
The song is set in common time and has a moderate tempo of 115 beats per minute.

Track listing
 Promotional 12" single
 "Don't Make a Fool of Yourself" (The Shep Pettibone Mix) – 7:05
 "Don't Make a Fool of Yourself" (Shep Pettibone Radio Edit) – 4:00
 "Don't Make a Fool of Yourself" (Try It Out Lover Mix) – 7:47
 "Don't Make a Fool of Yourself" (Pumpin Mix) – 4:25
 Cassette single
 "Don't Make a Fool of Yourself" (The Shep Pettibone Mix) – -:--
 "Fly By Night" – -:--
 "Don't Make a Fool of Yourself" (The Shep Pettibone Mix) – -:--
 "Fly By Night" – -:--

Personnel
Skip Hahn, Stacey Q – Backing vocalist
Jon St. James, Karl Moet – drums
Karl Moet – sampler
Skip Hahn – guitar
Jon St. James, Rich West, Skip Hahn  – keyboards
percussion – Jon St. James, Karl Moet
Shep Pettibone – mixing
Shep Pettibone, Tuta Aquino – editing
Steve Peck – mix engineer
St. James, Hahn, Swain – songwriters
Jon St. James – producer

Chart positions

References 

Stacey Q songs
1988 songs
1988 singles
Dance-pop songs
Atlantic Records singles